Nordstadt may refer to:

Dortmund#Nordstadt, a district of Dortmund, Germany
Nordstadt_(Hanover), a district of Hanover, Germany
Nordstadt (Karlsruhe), a district of Karlsruhe Germany

See also
Hannover-Nordstadt station
Nordstad